Events from the year 1993 in Romania.

Events

January 
 26 January –  is arrested in "The Bus" case ), about a 1981 operation where 6 bus passengers were murdered.

February 
 8 February –  replaces  as prefect of Bucharest.

March 
 24 March – The government decides to establish a Council for National Minorities, a governmental body.
 31 March – The National Salvation Front fuses with the Democratic Party.
 April – Telefónica Romania, the first mobile phone operator in Romania, launches the Telemobil service.

April 
 14 April – The Council for National Minorities, representative of 17 ethnic groups living in Romania, is established.

May 
 23 May – The National Salvation Front officially renames itself to Democratic Party (FSN).

June 
 9-10 June – The Democratic National Salvation Front absorbs the Republican Party, the Cooperatist Party and the Socialist Democratic Party, renaming itself into the Romanian Social Democratic Party. Oliviu Gherman is reelected the party's president and Adrian Năstase is elected executive president.

July 
 1 July – The Democratic Party (FSN) creates the Social-Democratic Alliance (ASD) with the Traditional Social-Democratic Party (PDST).

August 
 28 August – Prime minister Nicolae Văcăroiu replaces 4 ministers of his cabinet.

September 
 15 September – The visit of Hungarian foreign minister Géza Jeszenszky in Romania starts.
 16 September – Hungarian minister of foreign affairs Géza Jeszenszky and his Romanian counterpart, Teodor Meleșcanu, sign a treaty on the promotion and protection of investments and an agreement to avoid double tax imposition.
 19 September – The visit of Hungarian foreign minister Géza Jeszenszky in Romania ends.

October 
 12 October – Virgil Măgureanu is named head of the Romanian Intelligence Service.
 22 October – A bust of marshal Ion Antonescu is inaugurated in Slobozia.

November 
 18 November – About 50,000 people march through Bucharest to protest the economic deterioration of Romania.
 29 November – Romanian singer Ioan Luchian Mihalea is murdered.

Deaths 
 14 September – Geo Bogza, Romanian poet, essayist, and journalist, titular member of the Romanian Academy (born 1908).
 4 October – Dumitru Stăniloae, Romanian Orthodox priest and theologian, titular member of the Romanian Academy (born 1903).

See also

References

Citations

Sources

External links